1846 in archaeology

Explorations
 Johann Georg Ramsauer discovers a large prehistoric cemetery near Hallstatt.
 Ephraim Squier and Edwin Davis find and describe Serpent Mound in Ohio.

Excavations
The Rev. John Wilson publishes "Antiquities found at Woodperry, Oxon", an early account of excavations at a medieval village site (in Oxfordshire, England).

Finds
The Stele of Arniadas is found at the necropolis of the Corfu Palaiopolis.

Events
 August 10 - The Smithsonian Institution is founded in Washington, D.C.
The Cambrian Archaeological Association is founded in Wales by Harry Longueville Jones and John Williams (Ab Ithel) and launches its journal Archaeologia Cambrensis.
The French School at Athens is founded.

Publications
Jacques Boucher de Crèvecœur de Perthes first publishes his discoveries over the previous two decades of a worked flint implement in the context of elephant and rhinoceros remains in the gravels of the Somme valley
John Disney publishes first edition of Museum Disneianum
Journal of the British Archaeological Association first published

Births
 February 19 - Charles Simon Clermont-Ganneau, French Orientalist (d. 1923)

Deaths

See also
  List of years in archaeology
  1845 in archaeology
  1847 in archaeology

References

1846 archaeological discoveries
Archaeology by year
Archaeology